Amazonas may refer to:

Places
 Amazon River, known as Amazonas in Spanish and Portuguese
Amazonas (Brazilian state), Brazil
Amazonas Department, Colombia
Department of Amazonas, Peru
Amazonas (Venezuelan state), Venezuela

Other uses
Massacre in Dinosaur Valley, a 1985 cannibal film also known as Amazonas

See also
Amazon (disambiguation)
Amazon basin
Amazon rainforest
Amazonas Province (disambiguation)
Amazonas State (disambiguation)